Senator Friedman may refer to:

Cindy Friedman (fl. 2010s), Massachusetts State Senate
J. Isaac Friedman (1877–1949), Louisiana State Senate
Louis L. Friedman (1906–1997), New York State Senate